The third and final season of Under the Dome, an American science fiction mystery drama television series, premiered on CBS on June 25, 2015, and ended on September 10, 2015.

Based on the novel of the same name written by Stephen King, Under the Dome tells the story of the residents of the fictional small town of Chester's Mill, when a massive, transparent, indestructible dome suddenly cuts them off from the rest of the world. Military forces, the government, and the media positioned outside the barrier attempt to break it down, while the residents trapped inside must find their own ways to survive with diminishing resources and rising tensions. A small group of people inside the dome must also unravel complicated mysteries in order to figure out what the dome is, where it came from, and when (and if) it will go away.

Regarding the third-season finale, which served as a series finale, executive producer and showrunner Neal Baer said he was "very happy with this ending. I feel very satisfied. We made it so there could be another [season]… but it wasn’t necessary."

The season received mixed reviews.

After airing on Mondays for the first two seasons, the show moved to Thursdays at 10 p.m. ET for the third season, where it received an average of 0.96 in the 18–49 demographic and 4.70 million viewers over its 13-episode run.

Season plot 
In the third and final season of Under the Dome, the people of Chester's Mill decide to go through the way out of the Dome discovered in the previous season. What meets them is freedom, and they go on to live a year of their lives without the Dome - or so they think. Back inside the Dome, the few people remaining discover that someone they trusted isn't who they appeared to be, and as a result, they destroy the mysterious egg, which is the Dome's power source. Everyone outside the Dome is actually revealed to have been trapped in weird cocoons, and when the egg is destroyed, they escape from the cocoons to find out the year they lived was completely false; an alternate reality created by "The Kinship", an alien civilization. The Kinship takes over the minds and bodies of the townspeople, turning them into emotionless drones with a shared goal to take over Chester's Mill, and then the whole Earth, in order to evolve and spread their civilization after their home planet was destroyed. With only very few people not having entered the alternate reality and not having been cocooned, a war inside the Dome is set up between The Kinship and the Resistance. With the Dome's power source gone, it starts to calcify, severely limiting oxygen and posing a threat to both The Kinship and The Resistance. As the situation intensifies, the final few hours sees members of each group somewhat working together to find a way to make the Dome disappear, as well as killing the other group, in the final moments that have massive global consequences.

Cast and characters 
The cast members portray characters that were mostly taken from the original novel, "although some have been combined and others have changed jobs."

Main 
 Mike Vogel as Dale 'Barbie' Barbara
 Rachelle Lefevre as Julia Shumway
 Alexander Koch as James 'Junior' Rennie
 Eddie Cahill as Sam Verdreaux
 Colin Ford as Joe McAlister
 Mackenzie Lintz as Norrie Calvert-Hill
 Kylie Bunbury as Eva Sinclair / Dawn Sinclair-Barbara
 Dean Norris as James 'Big Jim' Rennie

Recurring 
 Aisha Hinds as Carolyn Hill
 John Elvis as Ben Drake	
 Grace Victoria Cox as Melanie Cross
 Max Ehrich as Hunter May
 Brett Cullen as Don Barbara
 Marg Helgenberger as Christine Price
 Eriq La Salle as Hektor Martin
 Mike Whaley as Malick
 Bess Rous as Abby DeWitt
 Andrew J. West as Pete Blackwell
 Frank Whaley as Dr. Marston
 Tia Hendricks as Audrey Everett
 Gia Mantegna as Lily Walters
 Megan Ketch as Harriet Arnold
 Vince Foster as Kyle Lee

Production 
On October 9, 2014, the series was renewed for a third season. Tim Schlattmann joined the series as an executive producer for season three. According to producer Randy Sutter, filming for the third season began on March 11, 2015, and ended on August 8, 2015.

During a CBS press briefing in May 2015, showrunner and executive producer Neal Baer promised answers in the new season. "We will tell you why the dome came down and what it’s about", with new executive producer Tim Schlattman adding, "You’ll see how these puzzle pieces form a puzzle that may be different from what you thought it would be".

A month later, Baer provided some insight on the series as a whole, saying that each season has "an overarching philosophy". "The first year was faith, fear and fascism. The second year was faith vs. science. This year, it's the individual vs. the group, with the theme being the enemy within."

Following information from CBS entertainment chairman Nina Tassler in August 2015 that "The Dome is coming down at the end of this season”, speculation started that the third season would also be the final season, which CBS confirmed at the end of the month.

In an interview after the series finale aired on September 10, 2015, executive producer and showrunner Neal Baer said he was "very happy with this ending. I feel very satisfied. We made it so there could be another [season]… but it wasn’t necessary."

Casting 
Marg Helgenberger guest stars in an extended arc beginning with the premiere. She plays a therapist named Christine Price who "has a big goal to unite the people of Chester's Mill and to teach the people in the community to live and make the most of their situation until they survive the ordeal."

Eriq La Salle, who directed an episode in the second season, is a guest star in season three. He plays Hektor Martin, the ruthless CEO of Aktaion Energy, the company run by Barbie's father, and also directed the ninth episode of the season.

Episodes

Reception

Critical reception 
In a June 2015 interview with The Hollywood Reporter to discuss season three, Neal Baer commented on the "less-than-favorable" critical reception to previous episodes. "I always feel like critics ... if they could do it better, they'd be writing the show. So bring it on! ... It's really easy to criticize, and it's really hard to develop a show." Baer also stated, "I think criticism is important, because it brings context to shows. It gives insight. ... But criticism has changed so much in the past several years because of the Internet. There are so many places, so many voices. Sometimes it feels like there's a bandwagon of sorts!" Jokingly, Baer did note that "fortunately, the audience has been pretty critic-proof in many ways."

The third season received mixed reviews. Positive reviews included Ken Tucker of Yahoo!, who wrote that "Under the Dome is certainly broadcast television’s most enjoyable science-fiction/fantasy series, a summer treat that, while sometimes silly and over-the-top, is never less than energetically imaginative and aware of the history of its genre", Scott Von Doviak of The A.V. Club, who wrote that "this show is always more fun when it leans into its sci-fi elements", and Paul Dailly of TV Fanatic, who wrote that "All things considered, this was a solid, if unspectacular return for the show". Negative reviews included Kevin Yeoman of ScreenRant, who wrote that "There is a certain joy that comes from watching something as consistently moronic as Under the Dome", and Tim Surette of TV.com, who wrote that "it takes balls to think your audience is so dumb and brain dead that you feel the need to explain the big twist in the episode that's about to happen before the episode even begins".

Ratings

References

External links 
 Under the Dome Season 3 Episode List on Internet Movie Database
 Under the Dome on CBS on The Futon Critic

Under the Dome
Pregnancy-themed television shows
Season 3